786 (seven hundred [and] eighty-six) is the natural number following 785 and preceding 787.

In mathematics
786 is:
a sphenic number.
a Harshad number in bases 4, 5, 7, 14 and 16.
the aliquot sum of 510.
part of the 321329-aliquot tree. The complete aliquot sequence starting at 498 is: 498, 510, 786, 798, 1122, 1470, 2634, 2646, 4194, 4932, 7626, 8502, 9978, 9990, 17370, 28026, 35136, 67226, 33616, 37808, 40312, 35288, 37072, 45264, 79728, 146448, 281166, 281178, 363942, 424638, 526338, 722961, 321329, 1, 0

50 can be partitioned into powers of two in 786 different ways .

786 might be the largest n for which the value of the central binomial coefficient  is not divisible by an odd prime squared. If there is a larger such number, it would have to be at least 157450 (see ).

Area code
786 is a United States telephone area code in Miami-Dade County. As an overlay area code, it shares geography with other codes in order to increase the area's pool of usable numbers, bringing ten-digit dialing to the Florida Keys.

In other fields
 80786 - 7th generation x86 like Athlon and Intel Pentium 4
 The USSD code 786, typically dialed as ##786# or *#786#, opens the RTN dialog on some cell phones. "RTN" is 786 when dialed on an E.161 telephone pad.
 In the New General Catalogue, NGC786 is a magnitude 13.5 spiral galaxy in the constellation Aries. Additionally, 786 Bredichina is an asteroid.
 In juggling, 786 as fourhanded Siteswap is also known as French threecount.
In Islam, 786 is often used to represent the Arabic phrase Bismillah.

In films
The number is often featured in films, mostly due to its auspiciousness in Islamic culture.
 Vijay Verma's (Amitabh Bachchan) coolie number in the 1975 Hindi film Deewaar.
 Raja's (Rajnikanth) coolie number in the 1981 Tamil film Thee, a remake of Deewaar.
 Iqbal Khan's (Amitabh Bachchan) coolie number in the 1983 Hindi film Coolie. 
 Bachchan has indicated that he belives the number is auspicious, as he was seriously injured but survived while wearing this number during the shooting of Coolie.
 The Telugu actor Chiranjeevi sported this number in the 1988 Telugu film Khaidi No.786.
 Veer Pratap Singh's (Shahrukh Khan) prisoner number in the 2004 Hindi film Veer-Zaara.
 Sultan's (Ajay Devgan) car in the 2010 Hindi film Once Upon a Time in Mumbaai bears the registration number MRH 786.
 In the 2011 Tamil film Mankatha, in the scene where Vinayak Mahadev (Ajith Kumar) shoots Prem (Premgi Amaren), Prem wears has a gold plate on his chest with the number 786 written on it.
 Ashish R Mohan's 2012 Hindi film Khiladi 786 features Akshay Kumar in the title role. The same film was released in Pakistan without the number 786.

References

External links

e-786.com Permissible to write 786
United Submitters analysis of 786

Integers